The Pacific Union College Academy basketball tournament is a tournament for Seventh-day Adventist high schools, held every January or February at Pacific Union College.

The tournament attracts teams from California, but also other states.

Results:

Pacific Union College
Basketball competitions in California
High school basketball competitions in the United States

References